Hyatt Hotels Corporation, commonly known as Hyatt Hotels & Resorts, is an American multinational hospitality company headquartered in the Riverside Plaza area of Chicago that manages and franchises luxury and business hotels, resorts, and vacation properties. Hyatt Hotels & Resorts is one of the businesses managed by the Pritzker family.

The Hyatt Corporation came into being upon purchase of the Hyatt House, at Los Angeles International Airport, on September 27, 1957. In 1969, Hyatt began expanding internationally. Hyatt has grown by developing new properties and through acquisitions, with the biggest growth coming from the acquisition of AmeriSuites (later rebranded Hyatt Place) in 2004, Summerfield Suites (later rebranded Hyatt House) in 2005, and Two Roads Hospitality in 2018.

In August 2021, Hyatt Hotels Corporation (NYSE: H) acquired Apple Leisure Group (ALG), a luxury resort-management services, travel and hospitality group, from affiliates of KKR and KSL Capital Partners for $2.7 billion in cash. ALG's hotel portfolio consists of over 33,000 rooms operating in 10 countries. The acquisition will extend Hyatt's brand footprint into 11 more European markets.

Hyatt has more than 1350 hotels and all-inclusive properties in 69 countries across six continents.

History 

The first Hyatt House opened in 1954 by entrepreneurs Hyatt Robert von Dehn (1904–1973) and Jack Dyer Crouch (1915–1990) as a motel near Los Angeles International Airport. In 1957, the hotel was purchased by entrepreneur Jay Pritzker for $2.2 million. His younger brother, Donald Pritzker, also took on an important role in the company. Considering the growing use of air travel for business, the Pritzker brothers realized that locating a high quality hotel near a major airport was a valuable business strategy. Within two years, they opened Hyatt House motels near San Francisco International Airport and Seattle–Tacoma International Airport.

In 1967, the company opened the Hyatt Regency in Atlanta, Georgia (today the Hyatt Regency Atlanta). The futuristic hotel was designed by Atlanta architect John Portman, who would go on to design many other hotels for the chain. It featured a massive indoor atrium, which soon became a distinctive feature of many Hyatt properties.

In 1968, Hyatt International was formed, to operate hotels outside the United States. It would soon become a separate company. In 1969, Hyatt International opened its first hotel, when it was awarded the management contract for the President Hotel in Hong Kong. The President Hotel was renamed the Hong Kong Hyatt Hotel (later known as the Hyatt Regency Hong Kong).

In 1972, Hyatt formed Elsinore Corporation, a subsidiary to operate the Four Queens Hotel and Casino and the Hyatt Regency Lake Tahoe Resort, Spa & Casino. Hyatt became a private company in 1979, when the Pritzkers bought the outstanding shares. Elsinore was spun off as a public company. The company opened the Playboy Hotel and Casino as a joint venture with Playboy Enterprises.

Donald died in 1972 and Jay continued to run the company.

The Hyatt Regency brand is the oldest brand in the company, with the Grand Hyatt and Park Hyatt brands being introduced in 1980. Some of these are styled as "resort" properties, and may have spas or other recreational facilities. One of the first of these was the Hyatt Regency Maui in 1980.

The Pritzkers took Hyatt International private as well, in 1982. However, Hyatt and Hyatt International remained two separate companies until June 2004, when substantially all of the hospitality assets owned by the Pritzker family business interests, including Hyatt Corporation and Hyatt International Corporation, were consolidated under a single entity called Global Hyatt Corp. On June 30, 2009, Global Hyatt Corporation changed its name to Hyatt Hotels Corporation.

In December 2004, Hyatt Hotels Corporation acquired AmeriSuites, an upscale chain of all-suite business class hotels from affiliates of the Blackstone Group, a New York-based private equity investment firm. Blackstone had inherited AmeriSuites from its 2004 acquisition of Prime Hospitality. The AmeriSuites chain was rebranded and called Hyatt Place, a competitor to the limited-service products Marriott International's Courtyard by Marriott and Hilton Worldwide's Hilton Garden Inn.

In December 2005, Hyatt acquired limited service company Summerfield Suites from the Blackstone Group. Blackstone had inherited Summerfield Suites from its purchase of Wyndham International. In January 2012, Hyatt Summerfield Suites were rebranded as Hyatt House in 2012 to compete in the "upscale extended stay market" against Residence Inn, Homewood Suites, and Staybridge Suites.

Hyatt launched its first lifestyle brand, Andaz, in April 2007. Hindi for the word 'style', Andaz is positioned as a luxury brand, with the first hotel being a rebrand of the Great Eastern Hotel in London, followed by hotels in San Diego, West Hollywood, Shanghai and New York City.

In August 2009, it was reported that Hyatt Hotels Corporation filed plans to raise up to $1.15 billion in an initial share sale. That November Hyatt completed an initial public offering and began trading publicly on the New York Stock Exchange under the symbol H. According to the filing Mark S. Hoplamazian was to serve as CEO and Thomas Pritzker as Executive Chairman. The public offering was a result of the acrimonious breakup of the Pritzker family empire. Accused of looting family trusts, Thomas and cousins Penny and Nicholas took control of the family businesses when they and other family members were sued by cousin Liesel Pritzker, claiming fraud and seeking damages of over US$6 billion.

On September 1, 2011, Hyatt acquired Hotel Sierra, which had 18 properties in 10 states. Along with Hyatt Summerfield Suites hotels, several of these properties were rebranded as Hyatt house in January 2012.

In November 2013, Hyatt introduced their first all-inclusive resort brands, Hyatt Ziva and Hyatt Zilara, with the first resorts being opened in Cancun, Puerto Vallarta, Los Cabos and Rose Hall, Montego Bay, Jamaica.

, Hyatt had over 627 hotels worldwide.

On October 28, 2015, Hyatt announced that they were in advanced talks to acquire Starwood Hotels in a cash and stock transaction. The transaction was not completed, and Starwood was acquired by Marriott International instead.

In 2018, Hyatt saw expansion with the acquisition of Two Roads Hospitality. This added the Joie de Vivre, Destination, Alila, and Thompson hotel brands to the Hyatt portfolio, a growth of 85 hotels in 23 markets.

In March 2021, Hyatt announced the official opening of Hyatt's 1,000th hotel worldwide, Alila Napa Valley in St. Helena, California.

Brands

Hyatt-branded properties have traditionally catered to upscale or business customers; its properties were either full-service or boutique hotels. In 1980, Hyatt added the Grand Hyatt and Park Hyatt brands to its portfolio. In 1995, Hyatt entered the vacation ownership market. Hyatt introduced the Hyatt Place brand, designed as a limited service offering for business travelers, in 2006. Hyatt House was Hyatt's first select-service property, catering primarily to travelers with long-term stays and at a more economical price point. Since then, Hyatt has added a wide range of other brands, especially in the lifestyle and resort segments.

Hyatt categorizes its brands under three categories: timeless portfolio (containing Hyatt's classic brands), boundless portfolio (lifestyle brands) and independent collections (soft-branded independent properties). Two additional upscale lifestyle brands, tommie and Caption, have been announced and will be joining the portfolio once the first properties open.

Timeless portfolio 
 Hyatt Regency – Hyatt's signature, upper-upscale brand
 Park Hyatt – top-tier luxury brand, offering residential-style luxury
 Grand Hyatt – large luxury hotels with fine dining and expansive meeting facilities
 Hyatt – Hyatt's brand of modern hotels
 Hyatt Place – mid-tier brand offering large rooms
 Hyatt House – extended-stay properties
 Hyatt Residence Club – timeshare and vacation rental resorts
 UrCove by Hyatt – Hyatt's new brand targeted to Chinese travelers, co-developed with Home Inn.

Boundless portfolio 
 Andaz – art-and-design-focused luxury lifestyle hotels
 Alila Hotels and Resorts – luxury boutique hotels built around sustainable practices
 Thompson Hotels – luxury boutique hotels
 Hyatt Centric – upscale lifestyle properties
 Caption by Hyatt – select-service lifestyle brand with smaller rooms and lively public spaces
 Miraval – luxury wellness resorts

Independent collections 
 The Unbound Collection by Hyatt – a collection of independent, upper-upscale and luxury hotels
 Destination by Hyatt – formerly Destination Hotels, luxury independent properties
 JdV by Hyatt – formerly Joie de Vivre Hotels, a collection of independent properties designed around their immediate neighborhoods

Inclusive Collection 
 Hyatt Ziva – all-inclusive family resorts
 Hyatt Zilara – all-inclusive adults-only resorts
 Zoetry Wellness and Spa Resorts
 Secrets Resorts and Spas - All-inclusive adult only beachfront resorts targeted at couples looking for romantic getaways
 Breathless Resorts and Spas - Adult only all-inclusive beachfront resorts
 Dreams Resorts and Spas - Beachfront all-inclusive resorts targeted at couples and families
 Alua Hotels and Resorts - European seaside resorts and hotels
 Vivid Hotels and Resorts - Adult only all-inclusive beachfront resorts
 Sunscape Resorts and Spas - Beachfront Resorts targeted at families

Notable properties

Atlanta: The Hyatt Regency Atlanta, the first Hyatt Regency hotel, was built in 1967 as the Regency Hyatt House, and was the first contemporary atrium hotel in the world. , it was the only major downtown Atlanta hotel with a front drive on Peachtree Street. Architect John Portman designed the building.
Austin: The Driskill is the oldest operating hotel in Austin, Texas, and a member of Historic Hotels of America.
Bangkok: The Grand Hyatt Erawan opened in 1991, replacing the government-owned Erawan Hotel at the Ratchaprasong Intersection in the modern-day city center. It is home to the Erawan Shrine, which is popular among wish makers.
Beijing: The Grand Hyatt Beijing opened in 2001, followed by the Park Hyatt Beijing in 2008.
Birmingham: The Hyatt Regency Birmingham opened in 1990.
Burlingame: The Burlingame Hyatt House, the first Hyatt built by the Pritzkers, opened in 1959 near San Francisco International Airport; in 1988 it was demolished and replaced with the Hyatt Regency San Francisco Airport.
Carlsbad: The Aviara, opened in 2010, is a Forbes Five Star & AAA Five Diamond resort.
Chicago: With 2,019 rooms, the Hyatt Regency Chicago is the seventh-largest hotel in the world, with the largest freestanding bar in the world. The hotel is known for views of the Chicago River and nearby attractions.
Dallas: The Hyatt Regency Dallas, built in 1978, is most notable for its association with the Dallas landmark Reunion Tower. Originally freestanding, the base of the tower was integrated into the ground floor of the hotel after an expansion project in 1998.
Denpasar/Bali: Hyatt has three hotels in this popular Indonesian holiday island - Hyatt Regency, Grand Hyatt, and Andaz (the company also has partial ownership in the first two properties, via a joint venture with two other parties).
Hong Kong: The Grand Hyatt Hong Kong is a luxury Hyatt hotel in Hong Kong, and the Asian flagship of Hyatt International. The Hyatt Regency Hong Kong, Sha Tin and Hyatt Regency Hong Kong are also five-star hotels in Hong Kong.
Jacksonville: The Hyatt Regency Jacksonville opened in 2001 under the Adam's Mark brand. Ownership of the riverfront hotel changed along with the name in 2005. With 966 rooms, it is the largest hotel in North Florida.
Jakarta: Grand Hyatt Jakarta opened in 1991 and is adjacent to Plaza Indonesia. Park Hyatt Jakarta inaugurated in 2018 in Menteng.
Johor Bahru: The Hyatt Regency Johor Bahru became a Thistle Hotel in 2009. Hyatt will return to the Southern Gateway of Malaysia when the Hyatt Place Johor Bahru opens in 2023.
Kansas City, Missouri: The Hyatt Regency Kansas City was the site of an infamous disaster, when its atrium walkways collapsed in 1981, killing 114. The hotel has since been renamed Sheraton Kansas City Hotel at Crown Center and remains in operation.
Kota Kinabalu: 
Hyatt Regency Kinabalu, opened in 1979 was Hyatt's first hotel in Malaysia and the oldest international-branded hotel in the city.
Hyatt Centric Kota Kinabalu, opened in 2022 is the first Hyatt Centric brand hotel in Southeast Asia. It was designed by the well-known Japanese based architect Kengo Kuma.
Alila Dalit Bay, which is expected to open on 2023, will be an eco-luxury resort and the first Alila Resort in Borneo island. 
Kuala Lumpur:
The Grand Hyatt Kuala Lumpur (which is adjacent to Kuala Lumpur Convention Centre) opened in August 2012 and marked the return of the famous chain to the Malaysian capital city. The Hyatt Regency Saujana opened in 1986, but underwent a management change in 2005.
Alila Bangsar Kuala Lumpur opened in 2018 next to the Bangsar LRT Station as Alila Hotels & Resorts’ first property in Malaysia.
Located in the upscale Mont Kiara neighborhood, the Hyatt House Kuala Lumpur Mont Kiara is part of the Arcoris Mont’Kiara development. It is currently the world's largest Hyatt House property, with 298 rooms.
Park Hyatt Kuala Lumpur is planned for the top floors of the Merdeka 118, the world's second tallest building.
In January 2020, Hyatt signed a management contract with KL Midtown (JV between Hap Seng Consolidated and TTDI KL Metropolis) to open a Hyatt Regency Hotel in 2024 at the latter's KL Metropolis development in northern Kuala Lumpur. This marks the return of the iconic Hyatt Regency brand to the capital city of Malaysia since the change of management of the former Hyatt Regency Saujana in 2005.
Hyatt Place Bukit Jalil is expected to be open by 2023, being the first Hyatt Place brand hotel in Malaysia which is located in Malton’s Bukit Jalil City integrated development.
Hyatt Centric Kuala Lumpur is currently under construction, located at the former Wisma KFC building.
Kuantan: Hyatt Regency Kuantan Resort was the only international-branded hotel in Kuantan city proper for many years (since opening in 1980) until a few renowned overseas hoteliers finally step foot here, in the late 2010s (including AC by Marriott and Swiss-Belhotel).
London: Andaz London Liverpool Street, built in 1884. Formerly known as the Great Eastern Hotel, it was the only hotel in the City of London from 1884 until the 1980s.
Los Angeles
Hollywood: The Continental Hyatt House (now Andaz West Hollywood)
Century Plaza Hotel, operated by Hyatt from 2006 to 2016, was restored in 2021 as the Fairmont Century Plaza.
Manila: The Grand Hyatt Manila is located in the Metrobank Center, the first supertall building in the Philippines (318m)
Mumbai: Grand Hyatt Hotel, Mumbai was designed by Chicago's Lohan Associates and opened in 2004.
In June 2021, the Hyatt Regency Mumbai closed, due to nonfunding for salary payment or operational expenses by Asian Hotels (West) Ltd., the owner of Hyatt Regency Mumbai.
Nashville: Grand Hyatt Hotel, Nashville is located downtown on Broadway and features 591 rooms, including 53 suites, 7 restaurants, 84,000 square feet of versatile indoor and outdoor meeting and event space, a rooftop pool, lounge and sundeck with panoramic city views. 
New Delhi: Hyatt Regency Delhi The Hyatt Regency Delhi is a luxury hotel in New Delhi, India, built in 1983.
New York City: The Grand Hyatt New York, opened in 1980, was the first major real estate development of Donald Trump, in partnership with Hyatt. The partnership deteriorated into a tangle of lawsuits, and the Pritzkers bought off Trump's share in 1996. The structure, built in 1919, is currently named the Hyatt Grand Central New York and is set for demolition and replacement.
Philadelphia: Hyatt Centric Center City Philadelphia, in the West Rittenhouse Square area
San Francisco: The Hyatt Regency San Francisco formerly housed a rooftop revolving restaurant called Equinox, offering 360-degree views of the city and the bay. The restaurant became a club for Hyatt loyalty members only and no longer rotates. The hotel was sold for close to $200 million to Dune Capital Management and DiNapoli Capital Partners in January 2007, about $250,000 per room.
Seattle: Hyatt Regency Seattle is the largest hotel in the Pacific Northwest, with 1,260 rooms.
Singapore:
Grand Hyatt Singapore opened in 1971 as the Hyatt Regency and with over 700 rooms, was also the company's largest hotel at the time. The property will be undergoing a 2-year renovation in late 2021, in celebration of its 50th anniversary.
Andaz Singapore is the second Hyatt property in the Lion City, having opened in 2017 as the first Andaz-branded hotel in South East Asia.
St. Helena, California: Alila Napa Valley was Hyatt's 1,000th hotel worldwide.
Taipei: Grand Hyatt Taipei is the only hotel operated by Hyatt Corporation in Taipei.
Tirana: On December 6, 2018, Hyatt signed a contract with Kastrati Group to manage the MAK Albania Hotel in Tirana, Albania. Formerly the Sheraton Tirana, the hotel will be rebuilt and rebranded as Hyatt Regency and Residences Tirana.
Tokyo: The Park Hyatt Tokyo is the second-tallest building in Shinjuku, Tokyo.

World events

1980–1989
 United States – The Hyatt Regency Kansas City in Kansas City, Missouri, was the site of one of the worst hotel disasters in U.S. history. On July 17, 1981, two of the three skybridges that traversed the hotel's lobby collapsed during a tea dance. The walkways were packed with people when a structural failure occurred, causing one bridge, which was hung from the bridge above it, to pull both bridges loose from the ceiling and collapse. The accident killed 114 people and injured over 200. The hotel was later renamed the Hyatt Regency Crown Center.

1990–1999
 Philippines – The Hyatt Terraces Baguio Hotel in the northern city of Baguio collapsed after a July 16, 1990, earthquake.

2000–present
 Israel – On October 17, 2001, Israeli tourism minister Rehavam Ze'evi was assassinated in the Hyatt Regency Jerusalem on Mount Scopus.
 United States – During Hurricane Katrina (August 23–31, 2005), the Hyatt Regency New Orleans received significant damage as almost all of its windows were blown out and the bottom floor was torn apart by flood damage. The hotel is located in the Central Business District and reopened October 19, 2011.
 Jordan – On November 9, 2005, the Grand Hyatt Hotel in Amman, Jordan, was targeted by a series of coordinated terrorist attacks along with a Radisson SAS and a Days Inn hotel.
 United States  - On Mother's Day, May 9, 2021, a shooting at a Hyatt hotel in downtown Phoenix, Arizona left one person dead and seven injured.

Partnerships
Hyatt has a partnership with MGM Resorts International.

In 2018, Hyatt began partnering with some properties in the SLH (Small Luxury Hotels of the World) chain, which allows World of Hyatt members to earn and redeem points during their stays at participating SLH properties.

In October 2018, Hyatt announced their purchase of Two Roads Hospitality, a lifestyle hotel management company, for a base purchase price of US$480 million, with Hyatt to take the management controls of 85 properties of Two Road's across eight countries. All the hotels had joined the World of Hyatt loyalty programme by 2019.

Loyalty program 
Hyatt operates a loyalty program called World of Hyatt, which replaced Gold Passport on March 1, 2017.

Hyatt's partnership with MGM Resorts International allows members of both companies' loyalty programs – World of Hyatt and Mlife, respectively – to "status match" (i.e., match their lower status in one of the programs to the higher tier achieved in the other), and then earn points and credits, as well as avail themselves of the perquisites and partnerships associated with the higher, matched status in both programs.

Recognition 
Fortune magazine ranked Hyatt #32 on its list of "America's Best Companies to Work For" in 2019, rising to #16 in 2021. The Human Rights Campaign (HRC) has awarded the company 100% in the HRC Equality Index for more than ten years, last in 2020.

See also

References

External links

 

 
Braniff
Hospitality companies
Hotels established in 1957
Companies based in Chicago
Companies listed on the New York Stock Exchange
Companies listed on the Frankfurt Stock Exchange
Hotel chains in the United States
1957 establishments in California
2009 initial public offerings